Miss Sweden is a 2004 Swedish drama film directed by Tova Magnusson-Norling. The film stars Alexandra Dahlström, Sissela Kyle, Magnus Roosmann, Sverrir Gudnason, Leo Hallerstam, Sebastian Ylvenius and Oldoz Javidi.

Premise
Moa lives by herself in a cottage in the forest and has a dead-end job in a toilet paper factory. She is trying to find herself; she has a dead-end job, yet has a talent for computer layouts and photography; she is an activist on causes such as veganism and anti-capitalism, accompanying her friends on demonstrations, but it seems that she may be doing this just to fit in. When at home, by herself, she listens to commercial pop music and wears make-up. As the story progresses, it transpires that she lacks self-esteem, and is used and abused by what she takes to be her friends. Men are happy to have sex with her, but dump her soon afterwards. She begins to gain self-confidence as she comes into contact with Jens, a troubled teenager whom the local authorities have entrusted to Moa's parents, perennial foster parents and do-gooders, to look after.

Cast
 Alexandra Dahlström as Moa 
 Sissela Kyle as Iris
 Magnus Roosmann as Bengt
 Sverrir Gudnason as Conny
 Sebastian Ylvenius as André
 Oldoz Javidi as Kim
 Leo Hallerstam as Jens
 Eva-Lotta Helmersson as Vanna 
 Michaela Berner as Josefin 
 Matias Varela as Hector 
 Peter Viitanen as Ola
 Figge Norling as Hantverkare
 Felix Fröjd as Vincent

Awards
For her role as Moa, Dahlström won the Best Young Actress from the Northern Countries (Bester Jungdarstellerin aus nordischen Ländern) in the Undine Film Awards in Austria.

External links
 
 

2004 drama films
2004 films
Films set in Sweden
Films shot in Vänersborg
Swedish drama films
2000s Swedish-language films
2000s Swedish films